The Nutty Squirrels were a jazz virtual band formed in imitation of Alvin and the Chipmunks. The Nutty Squirrels' music was characterized by their use of scat singing. They received a Top 40 hit in late-1959 as the song "Uh! Oh!". They also preceded The Alvin Show in which they appeared on television in 1960 as The Nutty Squirrels Present, but the show's success was rather decreased.

The group's first two albums, The Nutty Squirrels and Bird Watching, were released in 1959. The Nutty Squirrels' final album, The Nutty Squirrels Sing A Hard Day's Night and Other Smashes, marked a stylistic change from their first two albums, featuring covers of the Beatles songs.

Biography
After The Chipmunks' initial success in 1958, plans were almost immediately made to make them into an animated cartoon series. Unfortunately, there were some initial art direction snags (specifically with the character designs) and the show was delayed. This gap resulted in a race between the Chipmunks and an imitative group created by jazz musicians Don Elliott and Granville Burland, which they called the Nutty Squirrels.

Both musical groups featured the defining sped-up voices, but Ross Bagdasarian Sr.'s Chipmunks favored popular music while the Squirrels favored jazz, particularly of the bebop variety. Ultimately, the Squirrels made it to television first, in the animated series The Nutty Squirrels Present (appearing in September 1960), but its popularity was decreased as of the originals.

"Uh! Oh! (Part 1)" peaked at #45 on the Billboard Pop Singles Chart, while "Uh! Oh! (Part 2)" peaked at #14.

In the 2007 live-action/animated movie Alvin and the Chipmunks, during the credits, Ian Hawke (David Cross) is trying to get three squirrels to sing.

Personnel
 Don Elliott: vocals, trumpet, vibraphone, possible other instruments
 Granville Alexander "Sascha" Burland: vocals

Among the New York-based session musicians playing on these albums were Cannonball Adderley, (alto sax), Bobby Jaspar (flute), and Sam Most (clarinet)

Discography

Albums

Singles

Reception
In his 2019 autobiography, Mr. Know-It-All, John Waters wrote, "I should have told my mother about the Nutty Squirrels. They did jazz and they weren't junkies. This sped-up vocal group who imitated the Chipmunks actually beat them to television with an animated show called The Nutty Squirrels Present, and they looked down on the pop sound of Alvin and his gang. The Nutty Squirrels actually had a big jazz hit with "Uh Oh, Part One and Two," but if you go back and listen to the rest of their discography, you'll be blown away by some of their other riffs. These cats were smoking! If my mom had heard jazz like this at the wrong speed, she might have loved it."

Further reading
 The Rocklopedia Fakebandica by T. Mike Childs, St. Martin's (2004), pg 155

References

External links
Podcast - includes samples of the Nutty Squirrels
Links to mp3s of Nutty Squirrels/Cannonball Adderley session and a slowed-down Elliott scat solo

Animated musical groups
Fictional squirrels
Fictional musical groups
RCA Victor artists
Musical groups established in 1959
Musical groups disestablished in 1964
1959 establishments in the United States
American jazz ensembles
Vocal jazz ensembles